Humberto Fuentes Rodríguez (born December 13, 1961) is a retired male weightlifter from Venezuela. He competed in three Summer Olympics for his native South American country during his career.

Major results

References

sports-reference

1961 births
Living people
Venezuelan male weightlifters
Weightlifters at the 1980 Summer Olympics
Weightlifters at the 1988 Summer Olympics
Weightlifters at the 1992 Summer Olympics
Olympic weightlifters of Venezuela
Weightlifters at the 1991 Pan American Games
Pan American Games silver medalists for Venezuela
Pan American Games medalists in weightlifting
Central American and Caribbean Games medalists in weightlifting
Central American and Caribbean Games gold medalists for Venezuela
Central American and Caribbean Games silver medalists for Venezuela
Competitors at the 1986 Central American and Caribbean Games
Competitors at the 1990 Central American and Caribbean Games
Competitors at the 1993 Central American and Caribbean Games
Medalists at the 1991 Pan American Games
20th-century Venezuelan people
21st-century Venezuelan people